This is a list of broadcast television stations that are licensed in the U.S. state of Alaska.

Full-power stations
VC refers to the station's PSIP virtual channel. RF refers to the station's physical RF channel.

Defunct full-power stations
Channel 2: KATV - Ketchikan
Channel 4: KATV - Ketchikan
Channel 4: KYUK-TV – PBS – Bethel (September 14, 1972 – early 2009)
Channel 4: KSA-TV - NBC - Sitka, Alaska (November 15, 1959-1983)
Channel 5: KATV - Ketchikan
Channel 6: KATV - Ketchikan
Channel 7: KFYF – Fox – Fairbanks (1992–2017)

LPTV stations

Translators

Microwave service
ARCS: The Alaska Rural Communications Service, which provides some original programming and also "cherry-picks" retransmissions from among the broadcast stations in Anchorage, to provide television service to remote areas.

Television stations
Alaska